Thomas Murray House may refer to:

 Thomas Murray House (Davenport, Iowa), listed on the National Register of Historic Places listings in Scott County, Iowa
Thomas J. Murray House, Mars Hill, North Carolina, listed on the National Register of Historic Places in North Carolina
 Thomas Murray House (Clearfield, Pennsylvania), listed on the National Register of Historic Places in Clearfield County, Pennsylvania
 Thomas Murray House (Virginia Beach, Virginia), listed on the NRHP in Virginia